From November 15 to 16, 2006, a major tornado outbreak occurred across the Southern United States and into the Mid-Atlantic States. Ten people were killed by the many tornadoes that damaged many communities. The bulk of the tornadoes took place on November 15, but the deadliest tornado took place on the morning of November 16 in southern North Carolina. In total, 32 tornadoes were confirmed. Additionally, this was the last outbreak that used the original Fujita scale for measuring tornado intensity, as it was being superseded by the Enhanced (EF) scale in January 2007.

Meteorological synopsis
A moderate risk of severe weather was issued by the Storm Prediction Center for a large section of the Southeast for the night of the November 14 into November 15. The outbreak took place along a sharp cold front that tracked across the entire region from west to east. The activity started in the overnight hours in Louisiana and Arkansas and tracked eastward, producing scattered tornadoes across the entire Gulf Coast and into the Carolinas over the next 36 hours. The most severe tornadoes took place in St. Helena Parish, Louisiana where one person was killed in a trailer, near Sumrall, Mississippi where an F3 tornado led to severe damage and numerous injuries, and in Montgomery, Alabama where an indoor roller skating park was destroyed with 30 children inside (but no serious injuries occurred there). When the line crossed into Georgia and northern Florida, it formed into a squall line. However, breaks in the squall line allowed supercells to form in the overnight hours, and early on the 16th, the deadly tornado in southern North Carolina formed at the end of the outbreak.

Confirmed tornadoes

November 15 event

November 16 event

Non-tornadic events
Three other deaths occurred that were not related to tornadoes; one was a utility worker that was electrocuted checking downed power lines in South Carolina and two were in car crashes in North Carolina related to severe thunderstorms.

See also
List of North American tornadoes and tornado outbreaks

References

 Tornado kills at least 8 in N.C. - Yahoo! News - retrieved on 18 November 2006
 Tornado Victims Pick Up The Pieces

External links
Storm Prediction Center
2006 deadly tornadoes

F3 tornadoes
Tornadoes of 2006
Tornadoes in Alabama
Tornadoes in Georgia (U.S. state)
Tornadoes in Louisiana
Tornadoes in Mississippi
Tornadoes in North Carolina
2006 natural disasters in the United States
History of Montgomery, Alabama
November 2006 events in the United States